Jaws: Original Motion Picture Soundtrack for Jaws was released on LP by MCA in 1975, and as a CD in 1992, including roughly a half-hour of music that John Williams redid for the album. In 2000, two versions of the score were released: one in a re-recording of the entire Jaws score by Royal Scottish National Orchestra conducted by Joel McNeely, and another to coincide with the release of the 25th anniversary DVD by Decca/Universal, featuring the entire 51 minutes of the original score. The score was reissued again in 2015 through Intrada Records containing the full film score along with alternates, source music and a remaster of the 1975 album. In 2005, it was ranked No.6 in AFI's 100 Years of Film Scores, a list which compiles the greatest
American film scores.

Overview
John Williams composed the film's score, which earned him an Academy Award, his second win and first for Original Score, and was later ranked the sixth greatest score by the American Film Institute. The main "shark" theme, a simple alternating pattern of two notes—variously identified as "E and F" or "F and F sharp"—became a classic piece of suspense music, synonymous with approaching danger (see leading-tone). Williams described the theme as "grinding away at you, just as a shark would do, instinctual, relentless, unstoppable." The piece was performed by tuba player Tommy Johnson. When asked by Johnson why the melody was written in such a high register and not played by the more appropriate French horn, Williams responded that he wanted it to sound "a little more threatening". When Williams first demonstrated his idea to Spielberg, playing just the two notes on a piano, Spielberg was said to have laughed, thinking that it was a joke. As Williams saw similarities between Jaws and pirate movies, at other points in the score he evoked "pirate music", which he called "primal, but fun and entertaining". The primal opening notes are developed from the opening foreboding tone of Ravel's "La Valse", also bearing resemblance to the opening of the 4th movement of Dvořák's "New World Symphony". Calling for rapid, percussive string playing, the score contains echoes of La mer by Claude Debussy as well of Igor Stravinsky's The Rite of Spring. In 1959, the main melody of the Jaws theme appeared near the start of the "Headshrinker" episode of the radio series, Suspense.

There are various interpretations of the meaning and effectiveness of the primary music theme, which is widely described as one of the most recognizable cinematic themes of all time. Music scholar Joseph Cancellaro proposes that the two-note expression mimics the shark's heartbeat. According to Alexandre Tylski, like themes Bernard Herrmann wrote for Taxi Driver, North by Northwest, and particularly Mysterious Island, it suggests human respiration. He further argues that the score's strongest motif is actually "the split, the rupture"—when it dramatically cuts off, as after Chrissie's death. The relationship between sound and silence is also taken advantage of in the way the audience is conditioned to associate the shark with its theme, which is exploited toward the film's climax when the shark suddenly appears with no musical introduction.

Spielberg later said that without Williams's score the film would have been only half as successful, and according to Williams it jumpstarted his career. He had previously scored Spielberg's debut feature, The Sugarland Express, and went on to collaborate with the director on almost all of his films.

Track listings

* = Previously unreleased

** = Includes unreleased music

† = Includes music not used in the film

2015 Intrada Records 2CD release

Disc 1

Disc 2

References

John Williams soundtracks
Soundtrack
1975 soundtrack albums
1970s film soundtrack albums
MCA Records soundtracks
Grammy Award for Best Score Soundtrack for Visual Media
Scores that won the Best Original Score Academy Award